Calvoliopsis is a genus of mites in the family Acaridae.

Species
 Calvoliopsis rugosus Mahunka, 1973

References

Acaridae